Crater 2 is a low-surface-brightness dwarf satellite galaxy of the Milky Way, located approximately 380,000 ly from Earth. Its discovery in 2016 revealed significant gaps in astronomer's understanding of galaxies possessing relatively small half-light diameters and suggested the possibility of many undiscovered dwarf galaxies orbiting the Milky Way. Crater 2 was identified in imaging data from the VST ATLAS survey. 

The galaxy has a half-light radius of ∼, making it the fourth largest satellite of the Milky Way. It has an angular size about double of that of the moon. Despite the large size, Crater 2 has a surprisingly low surface brightness, implying that it is not very massive. In addition, its velocity dispersion is also low, suggesting it may have formed in a halo of low dark matter density. Alternatively, it may be a result of tidal interactions with it and larger galaxies, such as the Milky Way and the Large Magellanic Cloud, but according to some simulations, this would not explain the relatively large size. This unusually low velocity dispersion was predicted using Modified Newtonian Dynamics, an alternative to the dark matter hypothesis. This prediction was later confirmed by observations.

See also
Antlia 2
Satellite galaxies of the Milky Way
Local Group

References

External links
CDS Aladin previewer: image. 
CDS Aladin Lite: image.

Dwarf spheroidal galaxies
Local Group
Low surface brightness galaxies
Crater (constellation)
20160414